Ningbo East railway station is a railway station on the Ningbo–Taizhou–Wenzhou railway located in Yinzhou District, Ningbo, Zhejiang, China. It was originally built as a cargo station until the reconstruction of Ningbo railway station when Ningbo East railway station opened to passengers on 8 September 2010. Starting from 28 December 2013, the reconstruction of Ningbo railway station is finished, and the east railway station stopped opening for passengers and became an auxiliary station for examining, repairing and storing overnight trains.

Traffic
South Sangtian Road was built as a major road connecting north and south Yinzhou as well as Ningbo East railway station.

See also
Ningbo railway station

References
(Chinese) 铁路宁波东站试桩开工
(Chinese) 火车东站明年６月建成 火车北站搬迁到洪塘
(Chinese) 鄞州新城区与宁波中心城区将再添1条通道
(English) Ningbo East Railway Station opened to the public

Railway stations in Zhejiang
Railway stations in China opened in 2010
Stations on the Hangzhou–Fuzhou–Shenzhen High-Speed Railway